Sir Vincent Brian Wigglesworth CBE FRS (17 April 1899 – 11 February 1994) was a British entomologist who made significant contributions to the field of insect physiology. He established the field in a textbook which was updated in a number of editions.

In particular, he studied metamorphosis. His most significant contribution was the discovery that neurosecretory cells in the brain of the South American kissing bug, Rhodnius prolixus, secrete a crucial hormone that triggers the prothoracic gland to release prothoracicotropic hormone (PTTH), which regulates the process of metamorphosis. This was the first experimental confirmation of the function of neurosecretory cells. He went on to discover another hormone, called the juvenile hormone, which prevented the development of adult characteristics in R. prolixus until the insect had reached the appropriate larval stage. Wigglesworth was able to distort the developmental phases of the insect by controlling levels of this hormone. From these observations, Wigglesworth was able to develop a coherent theory of how an insect's genome can selectively activate hormones which determine its development and morphology.

Personal life
Wigglesworth served in the Royal Field Artillery in France in World War I. He received his degree from the University of Cambridge and lectured at the London School of Hygiene and Tropical Medicine, the University of London, and finally at the University of Cambridge.
  
He was named Quick Professor of Biology at the University of Cambridge in 1952, appointed CBE in 1951, and knighted in 1964.

Wigglesworth was President of the Royal Entomological Society from 1963 to 1964 and the Association of Applied Biologists from 1966 to 1967. He was elected to the American Academy of Arts and Sciences in 1960, the United States National Academy of Sciences in 1971, and the American Philosophical Society in 1982.

He married Mable K Semple in St Albans in 1922. They had four children.

The bacterium Wigglesworthia glossinidia, which lives in the gut of the tsetse fly, is named for him.

Works

Books
 Insect physiology

References

External links
 Beament, James. Obituary: Professor Sir Vincent Wigglesworth, The Independent on Sunday, 1994-02-16
 The Papers of Sir Vincent Wigglesworth held at Churchill Archives Centre
 

1899 births
1994 deaths
Frink Medal winners
Royal Medal winners
Place of birth missing
Place of death missing
Knights Bachelor
British entomologists
Fellows of the Royal Entomological Society
Fellows of the Royal Society
Foreign associates of the National Academy of Sciences
Royal Field Artillery officers
British Army personnel of World War I
Quick Professors of Biology
Alumni of Gonville and Caius College, Cambridge
Academics of the London School of Hygiene & Tropical Medicine
Commanders of the Order of the British Empire
20th-century British zoologists

Members of the American Philosophical Society
Presidents of the Association of Applied Biologists
Presidents of the Royal Entomological Society